"What Can I Do with My Heart " is a song recorded by American country music artist Juice Newton.  It was released in December 1986 as the fifth single from the original version of the Old Flame album (subsequent editions of the album contained eight to eleven tracks). In 1987, the song reached #9 on the Billboard Hot Country Singles & Tracks chart. Notably, the song was written by Newton's long-time musical partner Otha Young, who also penned Newton's first number-one country hit, "The Sweetest Thing (I've Ever Known)".

Charts

References

1985 songs
1987 singles
Juice Newton songs
Songs written by Otha Young
RCA Records singles
Song recordings produced by Richard Landis